Teach For All is a global network of 61 independent, locally led and funded partner organizations whose stated shared mission is to "expand educational opportunity around the world by increasing and accelerating the impact of social enterprises that are cultivating the leadership necessary for change." Each partner aims to recruit and develop diverse graduates and professionals to exert leadership through two-year commitments to teach in their nations' high-need classrooms and lifelong commitments to expand opportunity for children. The organization was founded in 2007 by Wendy Kopp (founder and former CEO of Teach For America) and Brett Wigdortz (founder and former CEO of Teach First). Teach For All works to accelerate partners' progress and increase their impact by capturing and sharing knowledge, facilitating network connections, provisioning global resources, and fostering leadership development of staff, teachers, and alumni.

History
Teach For America founder Wendy Kopp and Teach First founder Brett Wigdortz co-founded Teach For All after fielding numerous requests from social entrepreneurs around the world who wanted to create similar organizations that would expand educational opportunities in their own countries. Since its launch at the Clinton Global Initiative in September 2007, Teach For All has grown to include 59 partners on six continents as of February 2021 who are pursuing a similar approach to working towards educational equity and excellence for all of their nations' children. The organization has global hubs in New York, Washington, London, Doha, Pune, and Hong Kong. It has an annual budget of $19.9 million provided by global foundations, corporations, and individuals.

Organization structure
Teach For All is a network of organizations with a unifying mission to expand educational opportunity. Teach For All partner organizations work to improve the education of students in classrooms now, while simultaneously working to build the long-term movement for educational equity in their countries. In order to achieve this, Teach For All partner organizations recruit outstanding graduates and professionals from a range of academic disciplines to commit two years to teach in high-need schools and communities and to work throughout their lives to ensure more students are able to fulfill their potential. Teach For All network partners provide participants with ongoing training and support throughout their initial two-year commitments, and foster the development of alumni as leaders for educational change.

In a 2017 lecture at Princeton University reported in the Daily Princetonian, Teach For All co-founder Wendy Kopp said, "In actuality, the organization’s primary aim is to find solutions for 'the big, complex, systemic challenges that can’t be solved in classrooms alone'."

Teach For All is based on the concept of global-local practice-partners which launch grassroots organizations in their countries and belong to a global network of organizations. It is described by Thomas Friedman as "a loose global network of locally run teams of teachers, who share best practices and target young people in support of a single goal." The Teach For All approach is demand driven; in almost all cases, the organization is approached by already established efforts interested in joining the network, rather than proactively spreading the approach.

The organisation cites diverse cultural contexts across its different network partners as one of its major strengths, allowing partner organisations to make an impact within their own spheres of influence and socio-political structures.

Teach For All forms partnerships with organizations that share the same theory of change and are committed to eight unifying principles, quoted here:1. Recruiting and selecting as many as possible of the country's most promising future leaders of all academic disciplines and career interests who demonstrate the core competencies to positively impact student achievement and become long-term leaders able to effect systemic change

2. Training and developing participants so they build the skills, mindsets, and knowledge needed to maximize impact on student achievement

3. Placing participants as teachers for two years in regular beginning teaching positions in areas of educational need, with clear accountability for their classrooms

4. Accelerating the leadership of alumni by fostering the network between them and creating clear and compelling paths to leadership for expanding educational opportunity

5. Driving measurable impact in the short term on student achievement and in the long term on the development of leaders who will help ensure educational opportunity for all

6. A local social enterprise that adapts the model thoughtfully to the national context, innovates and increases impact over time, and possesses the mission-driven leadership and organizational capacity necessary to achieve ambitious goals despite constraints

7. Independence from the control of government and other external entities, with an autonomous Board, a diversified funding base, and the freedom to make operational decisions, challenge traditional paradigms, and sustain the model in the face of political changes

8. Partnerships with the public and private sectors that provide the teaching placements, funding, and supportive policy environment necessary to achieve scale and sustain impact over time, while increasing accountability for resultsRosalind Wiggins Z., Rosalind (November 2013). “PromiseNet: Toward A More Unified Network?” Yale School of Management Case Study. Retrieved 18 April 2016

Partners
Teach For All currently has more than 60 partner organizations around the world. Within this network, Teach For All partners have placed over 65,000 teachers and impacted more than 6,000,000 children. In recent years, Teach For All partners support over 16,000 teachers impacting over 1,150,000 children annually. There have been inquiries about joining the Teach For All network from social entrepreneurs in a number of additional countries.

Requirements
The Teach For All theory of change is based on developing "leaders in any sector who have seen the battlefield [of educating in under-served communities and] will become powerful allies in the quest to improve the worst schools." Approximately 50-70 percent of Teach For All partners' alumni stay in education long-term. Some alumni continue to work towards improving education systems and outcomes in other ways, such as by developing online teaching resources. Upon joining the network, each local organization is responsible for its governance and funding and is encouraged to develop a distinct brand and logo.

Impact & Initiatives

Novice Educator Support and Training 
In February 2021 Teach For All announced the commencement of a three-year policy experimentation partnership with the European Commission. Co-funded through a European Union Erasmus+ Key Action 3 grant, The Novice Educator Support and Training (NEST) partnership focuses on mentoring for new teachers in under-resourced schools. NEST is intended to design, implement, and evaluate a system of adaptive mentoring for new teachers in under-resourced schools in Bulgaria, Austria, Belgium, Spain, and Romania. Teach For Bulgaria leads the consortium, with other Teach For All partners working alongside Ministries of Education, other public authorities, a teacher union, and a university. The NEST initiative draws on the experience of the previous Erasmus+ A New Way for New Talents in Teaching (NEWTT) project also led by Teach For Bulgaria.

References

Non-profit organizations based in New York City
International educational organizations